Agarose 3-glycanohydrolase may refer to one of two enzymes:
Agarase
Alpha-agarase